Diane Rosalind Collings (née Blaymires, born 5 June 1959) is a New Zealand sport shooter.

At the 2002 Commonwealth Games she won the bronze medal in the fullbore open singles and finished seventh in the fullbore rifle open pairs.

Collings has won the Ballinger Belt three times at the New Zealand rifle shooting championships, in 1981, 1987 and 2014. In 1992 she was top New Zealander and sixth overall. She is married to sport shooter Mike Collings.

References

1959 births
Living people
New Zealand female sport shooters
Shooters at the 2002 Commonwealth Games
Commonwealth Games bronze medallists for New Zealand
Commonwealth Games medallists in shooting
20th-century New Zealand women
21st-century New Zealand women
Medallists at the 2002 Commonwealth Games